Namaklan-e Olya (also Romanized as Namaklān-e ‘Olyā and Namakgelān-e ‘Olyā) is a village in Beyranvand-e Jonubi Rural District, Bayravand District, Khorramabad County, Lorestan Province, Iran. At the 2006 census, its population was 405, in 81 families.

References 

Towns and villages in Khorramabad County